West Seneca East Senior High is a public, co-educational high school in the West Seneca Central School District and serves grades nine through twelve. It is accredited by the New York State Board of Regents.

Students
In the 2005-2006 school year, there were 1088 students enrolled in the high school. The average class size is 20 students with a total of 73 teachers.

52% of students graduated in the 2005-2006 school year, 53% went on to a four-year college, 38% went on to a two-year college, 2% went to another post secondary school, 1% went to the military and 4% went on to employment.

History
West Seneca East Senior High opened in September 1969. The need for a new senior high was paramount due to the use of split sessions - one in the morning and one in the afternoon.

Notable alumni
 Jordan Buckley - guitarist of hardcore band Every Time I Die 
 Keith Buckley - lead singer of hardcore band Every Time I Die
 Wilson Greatbatch -   engineer and inventor; held more than 350 patents; member of the National Inventors Hall of Fame; recipient of the Lemelson–MIT Prize; his most notable invention is the pacemaker
 Eric Ruhlmann- musician (Hand of Hope records)
 Robby Takac - bassist for the Goo Goo Dolls
 Mike Terrana - drummer in Europe; recorded with 31 artists on 52 discs; most recently toured with Masterplan and Tarja Turunen

External links
http://www.wscschools.org
http://emsc32.nysed.gov/repcrd2004/cir/142801060016.pdf

References 

Public high schools in New York (state)
Schools in Erie County, New York